Jeleniewo  is a village in Suwałki County, Podlaskie Voivodeship, in north-eastern Poland. It is the seat of the gmina (administrative district) called Gmina Jeleniewo.

The village has a population of 490 persons.

History 
In 1771, Polish King Stanisław August Poniatowski established a Catholic parish church in Jeleniewo. Afterwards, thanks to royal administrator Antoni Tyzenhaus, the village was developed into a town in 10 years. It was granted town rights in 1782, however, it lost them in 1800. The settlement grew regardless, however, it was overshadowed by the nearby city of Suwałki and its notable growth. In years 1815–1829, a postal road connecting Warsaw and Saint Petersburg ran through the village.

During the German occupation of Poland (World War II), in April 1940, the Germans arrested local Polish priest Władysław Brzozowski, and then deported him to concentration camps (see Nazi crimes against the Polish nation). He was liberated in the Dachau concentration camp in 1945.

Climate
The Köppen Climate Classification subtype for this climate is "Dfb". (Warm Summer Continental Climate).

References

Villages in Suwałki County